The Reformed Church is a church in Târgu Lăpuş, Romania, completed in 1863.

Gallery

References

External links
 Biserica Reformată

Târgu Lăpuș
Reformed churches in Romania
Historic monuments in Maramureș County
Churches completed in 1863